Rounding the Mark  (orig. Italian Il giro di boa) is a 2003 novel by Andrea Camilleri, translated into English in 2006 by Stephen Sartarelli. It is the seventh novel in the internationally popular Inspector Montalbano series.

Frustrated by his department's repressive handling of security for the G8 summit in Genoa, Montalbano seriously considers resigning. His attempt to unwind with a casual swim along the Sicilian seashore fails when he discovers a corpse in the water. The inspector's pursuit of the cause of death intersects with another mystery-the inquiry into a hit-and-run that claimed the life of a young boy who may have been victimized by human traffickers. When Montalbano realizes that he may have inadvertently aided the boy's victimizers, his internal turmoil intensifies.

References

2003 Italian novels
Inspector Montalbano novels
Italian crime novels
Italian mystery novels
Novels set in Sicily
Picador (imprint) books